Michel Bernanos (20 January 1923 – 27 July 1964) was a French poet and fantasy writer. He was the fourth child of French writer Georges Bernanos. He also used Michel Talbert and Michel Drowin as pen names to avoid the reputation of his father's name. His great cycle of initiation, inspired by two trips to Brazil between 1938 and 1948, centers around the novel The Other Side of the Mountain (1967).

Bernanos committed suicide in the Forest of Fontainebleau. Most of his works were published posthumously.

Biography 
The only biography that appears to be devoted to Michel Bernanos is by Salsa Bertin: Michel Bernanos, the Insurgent.

In 1956, he made a short appearance in a film written by Robert Bresson, A Man Condemned to Death Breaks Free.

Only The Murmur of the Gods was published during the author's lifetime, under the pseudonym Michel Drowin.

Bibliography 

 Le cycle de la Montagne morte de la vie (The Other Side of the Mountain; Black River, 1996) which includes: 
 "Le Murmure des Dieux" ("The Whisper of the Gods")
 "L'Envers de l'éperon" ("The Back of the Spur")
 "La Montagne morte de la vie" ("The Dead Mountain of Life")
 "Ils ont déchiré Son image" ("They Have Destroyed His Image")
 La Forêt complice (The Forest Accomplice; Le Castor Astral), which contains three stories
 On lui a fait mal (It Hurt him; Black River, 1996), three novels and six short stories: 
 "Les nuits de Rochemaure"
 "La Grande Bauche"
 "La Neige qui tue"
 "On lui a fait mal"
 "Le Cri des oiseaux"
 "La Forêt complice" ("The Colluding Forest")
 "La Parole donnée" ("The Given Word")
 "La Prière à l'étoile"
 "La Tempête"
 "Le Passage"

Le cycle de la Montagne morte de la vie 

Written in 1963 in Gentilly, Val-de-Marne, Court, it is divided into two distinct parts. The first part reads like a novel about the sea. A boy of 18 boards a vessel, where he is first bullied by the other crew members and then taken under the wing of the cook Toine. The boat is then blocked at the equator for weeks, and a mutiny ensues. The vessel eventually lapses into a storm, leaving the protagonist and his friend Toine alone and adrift on the sea. Here begins the second part, which becomes much more fantastic. Both main characters are stranded on a mysterious island, where the predominant color seems to be red. The novel was translated into English under the title The Other Side of the Mountain and published by Houghton Mifflin in 1968.

References 
 

1923 births
1964 suicides
French fantasy writers
20th-century French poets
French male poets
20th-century French male writers
Suicides in France